Middlebranch is an unincorporated community in northeastern Plain Township, Stark County, Ohio, United States.  It is located about 7 miles Northeast of Canton. It has a post office with the ZIP code 44652.  The community is part of the Canton–Massillon Metropolitan Statistical Area. The area is mostly residential, with notable amounts of land being used for farming as well. Trains from the Wheeling and Lake Erie Railway often run through the area carrying loads of scrap metal bound for other Ohio cities.

A post office called Middle Branch was established in 1844, and the name was changed to Middlebranch in 1893. The community takes its name from the nearby Middle Branch Nimishillen Creek.

Middlebranch School 
Middlebranch elementary school in the Plain local school district.   The school functioned as the district's first high school from 1926 to 1957. After that it was became a middle school until the 2006-07 school year when it became an elementary school.

Also 

 Plain township, Stark County

References

Unincorporated communities in Stark County, Ohio
Unincorporated communities in Ohio